The Creepy EP is the second EP by American rock band Relient K. It contains two songs from their later full-length release, The Anatomy of the Tongue in Cheek, and four exclusive tracks. This EP, along with Relient K's other early EPs, is out of print.

Track listing
All songs written by Matt Thiessen except "Those Words Are Not Enough", written by Matt Hoopes

"Pressing On" – 3:31
"Those Words Are Not Enough" – 4:49
"Operation" – 2:32
"Softer to Me (Acoustic)" – 4:12
"Jefferson Airplane (Demo)" – 3:56
"Pressing On (Back Porch Acoustic)" – 6:59

Personnel
 Matt Thiessen – lead vocals, guitar, piano
 Matt Hoopes – guitar, backing vocals
 Brian Pittman – bass
 Dave Douglas – drums, backing vocals

Relient K EPs
2001 EPs
Gotee Records EPs

fr:Creepy EP